Jimmy Connors was the defending champion but lost in the final this year.

Dick Stockton won the title, beating Connors 3–6, 6–4, 3–6, 6–1, 6–2 in the final.

Seeds

Draw

Finals

Top half

Section 1

Section 2

Bottom half

Section 3

Section 4

References

External links 
 Main draw

U.S. Pro Indoor
1977 Grand Prix (tennis)